The Washington International School (WIS) is an international school located in the Defence Housing Authority (DHA) area of Karachi, Pakistan.

WISDOM Educational Society is sponsoring education programs at the Washington International School since 1994.

References

International schools in Karachi
Defence, Karachi